Dinnington High School is a secondary school in Dinnington, in the Metropolitan Borough of Rotherham, South Yorkshire, England. It is a coeducational comprehensive school for day pupils between the ages of 11 and 18, and takes in approximately 1000 pupils from Dinnington and surrounding settlements (chiefly Anston, Laughton Common, Laughton-en-le-Morthen, Woodsetts, Hooton Levitt, Gildingwells, Letwell and Firbeck). The school is one of the older comprehensive schools in the area, and has substantial grounds on the outskirts of Dinnington, with all buildings, facilities and departments based on its 50 acre estate. Former pupils of Dinnington High School refer to themselves as 'Old Dinnonians'.

History

The Original School 
The original institution which gave way to Dinnington High School was The Dinnington School, founded in 1743 by a widowed woman, Miss Agatha Fallow. It was a small and private school which existed within the town. The Dinnington School was enough to accommodate the town's requirement at the time, as the population of Dinnington grew the school was expanded and moved locations a number of times. The Fisher Education Act of 1918 had made Secondary Education compulsory up to the age of 14, and this was now putting a strain on the Mixed Department of the Dinnington School. In order to relieve stress on the Dinnington School, talks of a new Secondary Department in Dinnington began in 1931, the former school would become a Junior School, with the over-10s moving to the new Secondary Department. 

The new school was built on the grounds of Throapham Manor, and was opened by Sir Percy Jackson (chair of the West Riding Local Education Authority) in 1935 as Dinnington Senior Boys' School and Dinnington Senior Girls' School. It consisted of a single timber building at the cost of around £21,300 which was divided into girls' and boys' departments. In 1938 the building was extended and a separate gymnasium was added. The Manor House was also used for teaching and housed 11 classrooms until its demolition in the 1970s.

Wartime and Military Occupation 

After the outbreak of the Second World War, Air raid shelters were completed on school grounds in April 1940, and the school could evacuate to them in under two minutes. The school turned over its playing fields for farming vegetables. Bees were also kept for honey, and a pig-sty was built to house 11 pigs. The school closed for a fortnight, during this time staff took turns by twos in being present from 9 - 8 and in resisting any attempts on the part of unwanted persons to commandeer the premises.

In 1939 Lieutenant Pepper and Sergeant Major Cressey were keen to obtain school buildings as barracks. They had received instructions to take only half the school and were anticipating immediate permission of such a step. The military occupied the school on Thursday 14 September 1939 at about 1:30 pm. The Boys' Department was broken up into groups of 50 pupils who were taught in the school on successive days. The girls' Domestic Science rooms were used to provide school meals, as the servery was in use by the soldiers.

Objections by the school were made, as presence of soldiers made Dinnington a military target, as a result, all military authority were asked to leave by 30 September. By way of recompense, the military dug the school regulation military-occupation trenches.

The Merger and Expansion 

In 1957 the two halves merged to form the coeducational Dinnington Secondary Modern School, and at that point there were already plans for a further merger with the secondary technical element of the neighbouring Dinnington Chelmsford Technical College to create the area's first comprehensive school.

This comprehensive school, Dinnington High School, opened on 23 September 1963 (a formal opening taking place a year later, conducted by Jack Longland). The area between the two merging establishments was developed with a new campus designed by Hardy Glover of Basil Spence & Partners. This campus consisted of four house bases and a sixth form college, along with a new main hall and a second gym.

The School is credited with the introduction of Rugby Union Football to the local area and in turn to the establishment of Dinnington Rugby Club which has produced players for the county and for Senior clubs such as Rotherham, Harlequins and Northampton.

The campus continued to be extended following the merger, with the addition of a swimming pool, technology block, sports hall, new sixth form base and library in the 1970s and 1980s.

The school came under the control of the new Rotherham Metropolitan Borough Council in 1974 and was renamed Dinnington Comprehensive School. Soon after the school uniform changed for the very first time, dropping the original black blazer and tie for more casual polo shirts and blue jumpers embroidered with the schools crest - this also briefly changed to black jumpers, before the school returned to its traditional black blazer and house tie.

The 1996 Fire 

In the late 1900s, Dinnington had a large problem with fire, with many students having been caught playing with fire on school grounds. This was especially problematic as much of the original buildings were timber built.  On 20 August 1996 the original 1935 lower school building (which still made up close to half of the teaching campus) was set alight by arsonists; the latest in a succession of arson attacks on the school. The fire destroyed the building and took with it student course-work and several computer rooms. House-bases were re-fitted into classrooms and this led to the brief phasing out of the house system at Dinnington, which had existed in various forms even during the pre-merger days.

The Modern Day School 
In 1997 a new school building was opened, standing on the site of the burnt-out original. The brick-built two-storey building called 'New Build' allowed a long-standing "ghetto" of 1960s-built portable classrooms (known as the Terrapin Plateau) to finally be retired. Several other aging prefab buildings on campus have been demolished in recent years.

On 27 January 2005 the school announced its success in a bid to become a specialist school in Science and Engineering. Previously, in 1993, it had been designated a technology school as part of a previous Department of Education grant scheme.

As of September 2011, a new system of Vertical Tutoring was established throughout the school. The system consisted of all years from 7–11 (6th Form separate), split up into mixed aged tutor groups. The previous housing system has been brought back, along with head girls and boys too. The school in more recent years has returned to a more traditional organisation by year group but retained the house names with each year group representing a house.

Dinnington became an academy on 1 February 2015. At the same time, the school name reverted to Dinnington High School.

The School Site 

There are four entrance ‘gates’ to the school: The main entrance is up through the Main Gate which allows vehicular access; Pedestrian access is allowed through the Postern Gate (off Manor Lane), Skinner’s Gate (from Skinner’s Wood), and the Coach Park Gate. The school faces Doe Quarry Lane, starting with The New Build, the newest part of the school. Behind The New Build is the Old Gym which is the oldest of the timber buildings still standing. To the left of the Old Gym is the 'Art Block, and Main Hall which is connected by flyover to Admin House, Hatfield House, Osborne House, 6th Form Base, Segrave House and Athorpe House, all of which are timber buildings that house communal areas and some departments. Sandwiched between the quadrangles are brick infills which serve as kitchens. Beyond Segrave house and over the service road is the Old College Building'. Behind the house bases is an area that used to be known as the Terrapin Plateau or 'The Ghetto' amongst students - though this part of the school has long been demolished. To the right of the Terrapin Plateau is the Technology Block and New Gym. Towards the back end of the school is the Sports Hall, Pavilion, and Drama/Exams Block. The White House was the final building at the back of the site, it acted as residence for the groundskeeper until School House and The Lodge were built on Doe Quarry Lane.

Buildings 
 New Building: mathematics, English, geography, history, religious studies, modern foreign languages.
 Old Gym: gymnasium with changing rooms.
 Art Block: art and creative subjects.
 New Gym: gymnasium with changing rooms.
 Technology Block: design and technology, engineering.
 Sports Hall: large indoor multi-use sports area.
 Pavilion: changing rooms.
 Drama Block: performing arts.
 Main Hall: large hall with staging.
 Admin Block: reception and offices.
 Sixth Form Block: computer labs and offices.
 Athorpe House: science.
 Segrave House: science and dining area.
 Osborne House: information technology, business, social sciences dining area.
 Hatfield House: dining area.

School Houses 

Dinnington has four school houses, Athorpe House, which was once reserved for the Sixth Form, has been reintroduced into the main school again as each year group is now allocated to a house. The Y7s of Sept 2022 are the first to bring Athorpe house back. Year 11 students now represent all houses with a school badge on a black tie. The school’s inter-house sports day is held annually, where students from each house contest the house cup. 

Students remain in their house until they leave the school. Each house has its own house tie. The four houses took their names and badges from historical local land-owning families:

Hatfield House 

The Hatfield badge is a white cinquefoil on a green background as also seen on the old Hatfeild Inn sign. The Hatfeild Family were land-owners in Laughton-en-le-Morthen in the 17th century. Hatfield House is positioned between Osborne House and the Main Hall. It is a two-storey timber building from the 1950s, and contains offices, a common/dining area, and the main hall. The building is connected to the Main Hall by a flyover running east, and to Osborne House via a west running flyover - there is also access to The 6th Form Base at the Osborne/Hatfield flyover junction.

Osborne House 

The Osborne badge is an heraldic ruffled tiger on a blue background. Osborne was the family name of the Duke of Leeds who had property in Kiveton Park. Osborne is located between Segrave and Hatfield, it is a near replica of Hatfield House, and is connected to Hatfield and Segrave by flyover, and Athorpe by the flyover junction. Osborne specialised in Geography, until the department moved to the newly complete New Build, since then Osborne has houses the schools Applied subjects including IT, business, and a range of social sciences.

Segrave House 

The Segrave badge is an heraldic lion on a red background. Segrave is named after the de Segrave family who owned much of the local area in the 16th century. The Segrave House Building is the tallest building in school, with three floors. The house has the largest floorspace, with an extension added in 2008, it is the only house that is separated from the school kitchens. Segrave is connected to Osborne and Athrope via flyover. Segrave specialises in science, it houses most of the school's laboratories on its upper floors.

Athorpe House 

The Athorpe badge is a falcon on a yellow background. Athorpe is named after the family who lived at Dinnington Hall back in the 17th century. The building also houses science laboratories. Since the lower school fire, Athorpe was refitted with classrooms, eliminating any downstairs communal space. 

Historically, each house was linked to disciplines: Hatfield, academic; Osborne, sports; Segrave, arts; Athorpe was originally the art block.

School Culture & Traditions

School Fayre 
Usually, the school holds a summer fayre on its grounds following the House Games, the school's sports day. This fayre is open to the public, and features stalls from the different departments with games and prizes, as well as a showcase of student work from the year. A stage is also set up on the sloping lawn in front of the Art Block, as a venue for live music. On this day, the school 'staff vs sixth form' game is sometimes held.

Funeral Processions 
When members on the staff pass away whilst in service to the school, on occasions the funeral procession passes the front of school on Doe Quarry Lane - where staff, students, and alumni gather to applaud the contribution of the individual to their school.

Science Stores 
The school science department has an old, and rather strange collection of specimens. In the Segrave House stores are a large collection of pickled animals in large glass containers. Amongst these animals are eels, rats and a pig. Although this collection is not used in the curriculum, it is brought out once every year at the schools open day. The department also has what they claim to be a real life human skeleton, donated to the school some years ago.

The Ghost of Mr Skinner 
There is a tale from the 1940s that the ghost of a former landowner, Mr Skinner, roamed the woods at the back of the school. This was likely started by students, but teachers have used this tale, probably to deter students from wandering the back end of the school where there were few staff. This likely gave the names, Skinner's Wood and Skinner's Gate.

Dinnington Language (Dinno Lingo) 
Whilst Yorkshire Dialect is primarily spoken by students, there is a subtle but noticeable collection of vocabulary that has been conjured in the school over the years that is only used by, and understood by, the students. This has been called the "Dinno Lingo", examples include:

 'Dinno' - Dinnington High School (or the town in general)
 'Boffa' - Someone who is considered nerdy
 'Dougie' - A stupid person
 'Wag' / 'Wagging' - To wag a lesson is to miss a class intentionally

Rivalry 
Historically the school has had a rivalry with the nearby Wales High School, particularly in sport.

Sport 
Dinnington has a good reputation for sport, especially in rugby. The school itself introduced Rugby Union Football to the local area, and in turn, the establishment of Dinnington Rugby Club which has produced many professional players over the years. Much of the schools infrastructure is dedicated to sport.

Sports Facilities 

 The Old Gym: Gymnasium hall with gymnastics apparatus, basketball hoops, changing rooms and a performance gym.
 The New Gym (Girls Gym): Large hall with changing rooms, gymnastics apparatus, and a high jump mat.
 The Sports Hall: The largest sports hall in the school, with two changing rooms, basketball hoops, futsal goals, and cricket nets.
 The Pavilion: Changing rooms.
 The Main Hall
 PE Classrooms
 The Astro Turf: Large artificial floodlit pitch with goals and dividing netting.
 Terrapin Plateau: Outdoor basketball courts
 Outdoor floodlit tennis courts
 Two grass football pitches
 Three grass rugby pitches
 Cricket Field
 The Plateau athletics track

The school also had tennis pavilions, a cricket pavilion and a swimming pool, but these buildings have since been demolished.

Science and Engineering 
Dinnington has a respected reputation in Science and Engineering, including Biology, Physics, Chemistry, General Engineering, Woodwork and Product Design. The school has been a specialist school in Science and Engineering and a designated technology school. The science department is larger than in most schools, spread across 12 well equipped laboratories in two buildings.

The Design & Technology department (which houses Engineering) also has its own building, which has been extended over the years. The building has a variety of rapid prototyping and manufacturing machinery, including 3D printers, laser cutters, lathes and vacuum formers. The so called 'Technology Block' boasts three large multi-materials workshops, a lathe workshop, a textiles classroom, two teaching classrooms, two CAD suites, a saw room, and materials commons as well as staff offices.

In Media and Popular Culture

BBC Panorama 
On 14 November 1961, TV journalist James Mossman, augmented by a BBC film unit, arrived at Dinnington to make a Panorama item on "Corporal Punishment in Schools". It would examine contrasting discipline in two schools in the West Riding; the other being a school in Leeds. On the 29th there was some follow-up shooting. And then on 4 December 1961, programme 264 of Panorama aired on the BBC.

Ofsted inspections 
Since the commencement of Ofsted inspections in September 1993, the school has undergone eight full inspections:

Headteachers

Boys' school
 Dr R.J. Pickard, 1935–1946
 Mr E.J. Ducker, 1946–1948
 Mr William G. Davies, 1948–1950
 Mr E.M. Spelman, 1950–1956

Girls' school
 Mr G.H. Butterworth, 1935–1942
 Miss Elsie Goldthorpe (née Storey), 1943–1956 (continued as head of the merged school)

Mixed school
 Miss Elsie Goldthorpe (née Storey), 1956–1963 (previously head of the girls' school)
 J.E.W. Moreton, 1963–1975?
 Mr Brian Ingham, 1975?–1983?
 Mr Gordon Forster, 1983?–1997
 Miss Jean Nicholson, 1997–2006
 Miss Sue Carhart, 2006–2007 (acting headteacher)
 Mr Paul Blackwell, 2007–August 2015
 Mr Chris Eccles and Mr Ian Holborn, September 2015–December 2016 (acting co-headteachers)
 Ms Rebecca Staples, December 2016 (Principal)

Notable alumni
 Eliot Kennedy, songwriter
 Benjamin Frith, concert pianist
 Jade Moore, footballer

References

External links
 Official website
 Unofficial history site

Dinnington, South Yorkshire
Secondary schools in Rotherham
School buildings in the United Kingdom destroyed by arson
Academies in Rotherham
Educational institutions established in 1935
1935 establishments in England